1,2-Dioxolane is a chemical compound with formula C3H6O2, consisting of a ring of three carbon atoms and two oxygen atoms in adjacent positions. Its structural formula could be written as [–()3–O–O–].

The compound is an organic peroxide, specifically an endoperoxide, and a structural isomer of the much more common 1,3-dioxolane, which is often called simply "dioxolane".

Synthesis
Synthesis methods for the 1,2-dioxolane core structure include oxidation of cyclopropane derivatives with singlet oxygen or molecular oxygen with a suitable catalyst, the use of autooxidation, nucleophilic displacement with hydrogen peroxide, treatment with mercury(II) nitrate, photolysis of extended π-systems, reaction of a bis-silylperoxide and an alkene, or reaction with a 2-perhydroxy 4-alkene with diethylamine or mercury(II) acetate.

Occurrence
Some derivatives occur naturally, for example in Calophyllum dispar and from the seeds of the mamey (Mammea americana).  Plakinic acid A (3,5-peroxy 3Z,5Z,7,11-tetramethyl 13-phenyl-8E,12E-tridecadienoic acid) and similar compounds were isolated from sponges of the Plakortis genus. Nardosinone is a sesquiterpene derivative with a 1,2-dioxolane element isolated from the plant Adenosma caeruleum.

Uses
Synthetic and natural dioxoloane derivatives have been used or considered  as antimalarial drugs.  Plakinic acid A and related compounds showed antifungal action.

See also 
 1,2-Dioxane
 1,2-Dioxetane
 1,2-Dithiolane

References 

Oxygen heterocycles
Organic peroxides